Anders Norling (born 15 March 1956) is a Swedish former breaststroke swimmer. He competed in three events at the 1976 Summer Olympics.

References

External links
 

1956 births
Living people
Swedish male breaststroke swimmers
Olympic swimmers of Sweden
Swimmers at the 1976 Summer Olympics
Swimmers from Stockholm